John Robert McClure (10 February 1913 – 6 July 1983) was an Australian politician.

He was born in Connewirricoo to farmer John Thomas McClure and Mary McDonnell. He attended state school and after the depression saw his family lose their farm was an shearer around Victoria, South Australia and New South Wales. He eventually acquired a farm at Harrow and on 4 September 1937 married Winifred Emily Haylock, with whom he had two children. In 1952 he was elected to the Victorian Legislative Assembly as the Labor member for Dundas, but he was defeated in 1955. He was subsequently an executive member of the Australian Workers' Union. McClure died at Harrow in 1983.

References

1913 births
1983 deaths
Australian Labor Party members of the Parliament of Victoria
Members of the Victorian Legislative Assembly
20th-century Australian politicians